Conservation science may refer to:

Conservation science (cultural heritage), the interdisciplinary study of care and protection of art, architecture, and other cultural works
Conservation biology, interdisciplinary study of protection of biodiversity
Environmental science, interdisciplinary study of protection of environment and natural resources

See also
Conservation (disambiguation)